Panagiotis Nakopoulos (born 27 April 1946) is a Greek middle-distance runner. He competed in the men's 3000 metres steeplechase at the 1972 Summer Olympics.

References

1946 births
Living people
Athletes (track and field) at the 1972 Summer Olympics
Greek male middle-distance runners
Greek male steeplechase runners
Olympic athletes of Greece
Place of birth missing (living people)
20th-century Greek people